Jyoti Bansal is an Indian-American technology entrepreneur. He founded his first company AppDynamics in April 2008, and went on to serve as CEO until 2015. AppDynamics was purchased by Cisco Systems for $3.7 billion, a day before AppDynamics was due for an initial public offering. He later went on to start two more technology companies – Harness.io and Traceable.ai, where he currently serves as CEO.

Early life and education 
Bansal was born in India. He grew up in a small city in the state of Rajasthan, where he helped his father run a small farm equipment retail business. Bansal attended the Indian Institute of Technology–Delhi, where he studied computer science from 1995 to 1999. In 2000, Bansal moved to the United States to work in the technology industry in Silicon Valley.

Career 
Bansal worked for a number of Silicon Valley start-ups from 2000 to 2007. The restrictions of his work visa prevented him from creating his own start-up company in the US before receiving a green card.

AppDynamics 
In April 2008, Bansal founded his first start-up, AppDynamics, an application performance management company. The company provides tools for monitoring, diagnosing and troubleshooting performance slowdowns and other glitches in software code. Bansal led the company as CEO for the first eight years, from its founding to September 2015, by which time AppDynamics had grown to over 900 employees.

In September 2015, Bansal became the Chairman and Chief Strategist, handing over day-to-day operations of the company to a new CEO. He went on to serve as the company's Chairman during its sale to Cisco Systems.

In June 2016, Bansal was awarded Ernst & Young Entrepreneur of the Year Award for Northern California.

In December 2016, AppDynamics submitted a prospectus to the Securities and Exchange Commission on the initial public offering (IPO) of its stock. The company was due to open for public trade in January 2017 when a deal was reached, just days before, for the sale of the company to Cisco Systems. The final offered price of the sale totaled $3.7 billion.

BIG Labs 
In October 2017, Bansal launched BIG (Bansal Innovation Group) Labs, a start-up studio, as his start-up testing ground to test out ideas and technology problems. In the same year, he launched Harness, the first start-up out of BIG Labs. In July 2020, Bansal launched Traceable, a second start-up from BIG Labs. Bansal currently serves as CEO of both Harness and Traceable.

Harness 
In October 2017, Bansal launched Harness, a platform for software developers to automate and simplify software delivery processes.

Traceable 
In July 2020, Bansal launched Traceable, a cybersecurity company that provides solutions for protecting software code against sophisticated cyber-attacks.

Unusual Ventures 
In May 2018, Bansal announced that he and venture capitalist John Vrionis were launching a new seed fund, called Unusual Ventures with over $500 million of capital under management.

Bansal intends to focus on mentoring early stage start-ups, partnering with nonprofits and offering frequent masterclasses for budding entrepreneurs.

References

Sources

External links 
  of AppDynamics
 Official website of Harness
 Official website of Traceable
 Official website of Unusual Ventures

Year of birth missing (living people)
Living people
Silicon Valley people
American technology company founders
American people of Indian descent